Khanandabil may refer to:
 Khanandabil-e Gharbi Rural District
 Khanandabil-e Sharqi Rural District